David Ferrer was the defending champion, but lost in the second round to Casper Ruud.

Fabio Fognini won the title, defeating Richard Gasquet in the final, 6–3, 3–6, 6–1.

Seeds
The top four seeds receive a bye into the second round.

Draw

Finals

Top half

Bottom half

Qualifying

Seeds

Qualifiers

Lucky loser
  Henri Laaksonen

Qualifying draw

First qualifier

Second qualifier

Third qualifier

Fourth qualifier

External links
 Main draw
 Qualifying draw

2018 ATP World Tour
2018 Singles